Luis Fernando Manrique (born 26 August 1981) is an Ecuadorian former professional tennis player.

Born in Guayaquil, Manrique grew up in Key Biscayne, Florida and played collegiate tennis for the University of Miami between 2002 and 2005.

After graduating he spent two years on the professional tour and was most successful in doubles. He twice featured at the Miami Open (Masters) doubles main draw, including in 2006 when he partnered with Guillermo Coria.

Manrique now works as a real estate broker in Miami and was previously a touring coach of Jean-Julien Rojer.

ITF Futures titles

Doubles: (1)

References

External links
 
 

1981 births
Living people
Ecuadorian male tennis players
Miami Hurricanes men's tennis players
Sportspeople from Guayaquil
Tennis people from Florida